Lophaeola is a genus of moths in the family Gelechiidae. It contains the species Lophaeola inquinata, which is found in Brazil.

References

Gelechiinae